Seohyun (born Seo Ju-hyun) is a South Korean singer, member of Girls' Generation and its subgroup Girls' Generation-TTS. Since debuting in 2007, she has collaborated with various artists and released several original soundtracks for South Korean TV series. Her career as a solo singer began in January 2017 with the release of her debut extended play Don't Say No.

Extended plays

Singles

As lead artist

Collaborations

Promotional singles

Soundtrack appearances

Songwriting credits

See also 
 Girls' Generation discography
 Girls' Generation-TTS discography

Notes

References

Discographies of South Korean artists
Girls' Generation